Pye Ester Agneta Engström (née Nanneson; born 8 June 1928) is a Swedish sculptor.

Born in Danderyd Municipality, Engström studied at the Konstfack (1945–48), the Royal Institute of Art (1945–48), and the Royal Danish Academy of Fine Arts (1948–53). She has been married to writer Clas Engström since 1951.

See also
Efter badet (Stockholm)

References

1928 births
Living people
20th-century Swedish women artists
21st-century Swedish women artists
People from Danderyd Municipality
Swedish women sculptors
Konstfack alumni
Royal Danish Academy of Fine Arts alumni
Swedish expatriates in Denmark